The 1998–99 United Counties League season was the 92nd in the history of the United Counties League, a football competition in England.

Premier Division

The Premier Division featured 20 clubs which competed in the division last season, no new clubs joined the division this season.

Also, Mirrlees Blackstone changed name to Blackstones.

League table

Division One

Division One featured 17 clubs which competed in the division last season, along with one new club:
Woodford United, joined from the Northamptonshire Combination League

League table

References

External links
 United Counties League

1998–99 in English football leagues
United Counties League seasons